The Donghae Line is a railway line connecting Busanjin station to Yeongdeok in South Korea. The literal meaning of its name, the "East Sea Line," reflects its position along the nation's East coast. It merged with the Donghae Nambu Line on December 30, 2016, and will merge with the Donghae Bukbu Line.

Stations

Major stations along the line include (in order):

Bujeon station, terminal station of the line and terminus of the Bujeon Line
Sinhaeundae station, a popular resort beach in eastern Busan
Gijang station
Taehwagang station (formerly Ulsan), major industrial city and terminus of the Jangsaengpo and Ulsanhang Lines
Gyeongju station (Singyeongju), historic city
Pohang station, seaport and industrial city
BEXCO station, where the G-Star gaming event is held

Services

KTX

Plans foresee direct KTX high-speed train service from Seoul to Pohang and Ulsan after the completion of the upgrades. From 2015, direct KTX trains are to reach Pohang from Seoul in 1 hour 50 minutes, cutting 33 minutes from the travel time with transfer at Gyeongju.  Under the government's 2010 strategic plan for 2020, the entire line may see KTX service.

Busan–Ulsan commuter trains

In the Busan–Ulsan section, higher frequency commuter rail service between Bujeon and Ilgwang began on December 30, 2016. Service operates approximately every 15 minutes during the peak periods and 30 minutes during the off-peak. The line is integrated into the Busan Metro network and accepts the Hanaro Card and Digital Busan Card, as well as the T-Money card from Seoul.

Upgrade

Pohang–Samcheok extension

At the time of thawing relations between South and North Korea, when the cross-border section of the Donghae Bukbu Line was reopened in 2007, the South Korean government considered the construction of a railway for freight traffic all along the east coast to the North Korean border. As part of the corridor, a new single-track, non-electrified line for  would connect Pohang and Samcheok, the end of a branch of the Yeongdong Line. new line is to connect to the existing railhead at Samcheok. Work started on the Pohang-Yeongdeok section on March 20, 2008, with a foreseen budget of 2,949.5 billion won for the entire line until Samcheok.

See also
 Korail; South Korea's national railroad operator
 Transportation in South Korea
 Donghae Nambu Line
 Donghae Bukbu Line

References

Korail lines
Railway lines in South Korea
Standard gauge railways in South Korea
Railway lines opened in 2015
Donghae Line